The  is one of the main ports in northern Japan, located in Hakodate, on the northern island of Hokkaido.

References

External links

Hakodate Port Authority

Hakodate
Hakodate